Peter Alan Broadbent (born 31 July 1952), known as Pete Broadbent, is an English Anglican bishop. He served as the Bishop of Willesden, an area bishop in the Church of England Diocese of London for twenty years, 2001–2021. During the vacancy in the diocesan see from 2017–2018, he served as Acting Bishop of London.

Education
Broadbent was educated at Merchant Taylors' School, Northwood, Middlesex. He was 15 years of age when he became a committed Christian through the Crusaders youth organisation. He studied English at Jesus College, Cambridge, and then studied theology at St John's College, Nottingham, before being ordained.

Career
He was ordained a deacon at Michaelmas (25 September) 1977 and a priest the next Michaelmas (24 September 1978), both times by John Habgood, Bishop of Durham, at Durham Cathedral. Broadbent's first curacy was at St Nicholas' Church, Durham when George Carey, who later became the Archbishop of Canterbury, was its vicar. Broadbent moved to the Diocese of London in 1980 to be curate of Emmanuel Church, Holloway and the Chaplain for Mission to Jim Thompson, Bishop of Stepney.

In 1983 he was appointed chaplain to the Polytechnic of North London, also serving as curate of St Mary's Islington. In 1989 he moved to the Willesden area, becoming Vicar of Trinity St Michael, Harrow and also became the Area Dean of Harrow in 1994 and the Archdeacon of Northolt in 1995.

Broadbent has served on the General Synod of the Church of England for over 15 years and was a member of its standing committee. From 1999 to 2000 he chaired the business committee of the synod and played a role in the foundation of the Archbishops' Council. He is active in Spring Harvest, Europe's largest annual Christian conference.

He was ordained and consecrated a bishop on 25 January 2001, having legally taken the See of Willesden in a ceremony immediately beforehand. Broadbent was one of three serving bishops in the Church of England to refuse to attend the 2008 Lambeth Conference, a gathering of all Anglican bishops convened by the Archbishop of Canterbury every 10 years.

Broadbent chaired the Diocesan Board for Schools for London from 1996 to 2006 and from 1999 to 2003 was on the governing body of the City Parochial Foundation. He is a member of the Labour Party and was a councillor for the London Borough of Islington from 1982 and 1990, being the chair of their Development and Planning Committee.

In the period between Stephen Oliver and Adrian Newman as Bishop of Stepney, Broadbent temporarily and additionally had episcopal oversight over that area from 7 July 2010 until 22 July 2011. He was later acting area Bishop of Edmonton between the retirement of Peter Wheatley on 31 December 2014 and the consecration of Rob Wickham on 23 September 2015. He additionally served as acting diocesan Bishop of London between the retirement of Richard Chartres and the consecration of Sarah Mullally. During his tenure he controversially described the Anglican high church tradition as "faffy ceremonial" that lacked the "deep faith" of the Anglo-Catholic tradition. With Newman's resignation due to ill health, Broadbent became Acting Bishop of Stepney again, from 31 October 2018 until a new bishop was appointed in 2019.

It was announced on 16 March 2021 that Broadbent would resign his see effective 30 September 2021 and take on a new role relating to the Diocesan 2030 Vision. On 1 October 2021, Broadbent received the Bishop of London's permission to officiate and licence as an honorary assistant bishop of the diocese; and became the Bishop's Adviser (2030 Vision).

He is a trustee of the Church of England Newspaper Broadbent is married to Sarah and they have an adult son.

Republican controversy 
On the announcement of the engagement of Prince William of Wales to Catherine Middleton, Broadbent declared on Facebook that he is a republican, said that the couple were "shallow celebrities" who would be "set up to fail by the gutter press", and predicted that their marriage would last less than seven years. He also called the Royal Family "philanderers" and said that the basis of the monarchy is "corrupt and sexist", while disparagingly referring to William's parents, Charles, Prince of Wales, and Diana, Princess of Wales, as "Big Ears" and the "Porcelain Doll". His views were reported in various Sunday newspapers and were widely condemned. Conservative MP Nicholas Soames, a close friend of the Prince of Wales, described Broadbent's comments as "extremely rude" and "not what one expects from a bishop".

Broadbent subsequently issued an apology for his remarks and agreed to "withdraw from public ministry until further notice" on 23 November 2010. Richard Chartres, Bishop of London (and a close friend of the Prince of Wales), said that he was "appalled" by Broadbent's comments and expressed his "dismay on behalf of the Church". It was announced on 10 January 2011 that Broadbent was to return to duty that day, both as Bishop of Willesden and acting Bishop of Stepney. He remained as acting Bishop of Stepney until 22 July 2011 (when the new bishop, Adrian Newman was consecrated).

Styles
The Reverend Pete Broadbent (1977–1995)
The Venerable Pete Broadbent (1995–2001)
The Right Reverend Pete Broadbent (2001–present)

References 

1952 births
21st-century Church of England bishops
Alumni of Jesus College, Cambridge
Alumni of St John's College, Nottingham
Anglican chaplains
Anglican socialists
Archdeacons of Northolt
Bishops of Willesden
Councillors in the London Borough of Islington
English chaplains
English Christian socialists
English republicans
Evangelical Anglican bishops
Labour Party (UK) councillors
Living people
People educated at Merchant Taylors' School, Northwood